Robert McLellan Bateman  (born 24 May 1930) is a Canadian naturalist and painter, born in Toronto, Ontario.

Career
Bateman was always interested in art, but never intended to make a living from it. He was fascinated by the natural world in his childhood; he recorded the sightings of all of the birds in the area of his house in Toronto and did small paintings with birds in their habitats. He found inspiration from the Group of Seven; later, he became interested in making abstract paintings of nature, strongly influenced by the work of Franz Kline. It was not until the mid-1960s that he changed to his present style, realism. In 1954, he graduated with a degree in geography from the Victoria College in the University of Toronto. Afterwards, he attended Ontario College of Education. Starting in 1957, Bateman travelled around the world for 14 months in a Land Rover with his friend J. Bristol Foster. As they made their way through Africa, India, Southeast Asia, and Australia, Bateman painted and sketched what he saw.

Bateman became a high school teacher of art and geography, and continued focusing his life on art and nature. After two decades as a high school teacher, he became a full-time artist in 1976. A year later Mill Pond Press started making signed, limited edition prints of some of his paintings; over the years, these prints resulted in millions of dollars being raised for environmental causes. His work started to receive major recognition in the 1970s and 1980s. Robert Bateman's show in 1987, at the Smithsonian Institution in Washington, DC, drew a large crowd for a living artist. In 1999, the Audubon Society of Canada declared Bateman one of the top 100 environmental proponents of the 20th century.

Robert Bateman's realistic and evocative painting style reflects his deep understanding and appreciation for nature, featuring wildlife in its natural habitat and encouraging the viewer to closely observe the natural world. He is a spokesman for many environmental and preservation issues, using his art to raise millions of dollars for these causes. The majority of Bateman's paintings are in acrylic on various media, and have been shown in major solo exhibitions around the world. He has been the subject of several films and books including The Art of Robert Bateman (1981), The World of Robert Bateman (1985), An Artist in Nature (1990), Natural Worlds (1996), Thinking Like a Mountain (2000), Birds (2002), New Works, (2010), Life Sketches (2015), Bateman’s Canada (2017) as well as several children's books.

Robert Bateman Secondary School in Abbotsford, British Columbia, Robert Bateman High School (currently closed) in Burlington, Ontario, and Robert Bateman Public School, Ottawa, Ontario are named for him. He is an Honorary Director of the North American Native Plant Society, and has received numerous honours and awards, including Officer of the Order of Canada and fourteen honorary doctorates from institutions such as the University of Victoria, University of Toronto, Royal Roads University, and McGill University.

A permanent home for his works can be found in the Inner Harbour of Victoria, BC. The Bateman Gallery houses the definitive collection of his works, and also includes a dynamic program of public events. It supports the Bateman Foundation, a not-for-profit organization whose mission is to promote the preservation and sustainability of the environment.

At 90, Robert continues a schedule of painting daily, public talks, and advocating nature.

Foundation 
The Bateman Foundation, a national public charity, inspires a lasting relationship with nature through the lens of art, and is currently one of the only non-profits in Canada primarily using artwork to promote a connection to nature and the environment. Established in 2012 by world-renowned artist and naturalist Robert Bateman, the Foundation grew from his philosophy that by helping people reconnect with nature they will be inspired to conserve and protect it. Through educational programs, community collaborations and Bateman Gallery exhibitions, they are inspiring a generation of people to build a deeper relationship with the natural world.

The purpose of the Foundation is to promote the preservation and sustainability of the environment by:

 Establishing and maintaining an art gallery to perpetuate, protect, enhance and promote the artistic and cultural legacy of nature-inspired artists, including Robert Bateman.
 Supporting or developing educational programs relating to the environment and nature-inspired artists.

Robert Bateman is already aligned with child-in-nature philosophies. He is associated in the public mind with pro-nature education by his work, writings and public speaking. He is widely regarded by the national and international conservation community as a “hero” because of his lifelong support and clearly articulated perspective. He is a natural and gregarious teacher and his artwork is vastly instructive. Finally, Robert Bateman is perceived by many to be one of the voices of reason and hope for healthy, rejuvenated and creative engagement with the natural world:From the beginning of time we have been connected to nature, but for the first time in history, that connection threatens to be broken for most of an entire generation and perhaps generations to come. When children play in nature – climb trees, build forts and dams in creeks and go exploring – here is what happens: they have less obesity, less likelihood of developing attention deficit disorder, lower rates of depression and suicide, less alcohol and drug abuse, less bullying, plus, they get higher marks…nature is magic.Bateman’s Sketch Across Canada is a nationwide project by the Bateman Foundation. They recently achieved their goal of distributing 33,000 free sketchbooks across the country, asking Canadians to venture outside and, in the words of Robert Bateman, “become bright-eyed three-year-olds again”.

The Nature Sketch Program started in 2016 as a volunteer managed family program in Victoria. The focus of the program is to engage the public to the importance of eco literacy, using art, nature and inspiration of Robert Bateman. In 2018 Anxiety Canada became a lead partner, with focus on using the program to assist youth with anxiety and depression. In 2019 the program was delivered to 3,000 youth and adults across 7 provinces; including along the Great Trail from BC to Nova Scotia to NWT.

Personal life 
Robert Bateman married Suzanne Bowerman in 1960. They had three children: Alan, Sarah, and John. In 1975, Bateman married Birgit Freybe Bateman. Their two children are Christopher and Robert.

In the early 1980s, Bateman and Birgit moved to Salt Spring Island. The couple purchased a home located on Reginald Hill Road, looking out on Fulford Harbour, that was designed by Hank Schubart and originally built for actress Eileen Brennan. In the early 2000s, the Batemans moved from the Reginald Hill house to a house on a lake in Salt Spring designed by their son in law, Robert Barnard.

Honours and awards 
 Life Member, Royal Canadian Academy of Arts
 Queen Elizabeth Silver Jubilee Medal, 1977
 Officer of the Order of Canada, 1984
 Member of Honour Award, World Wildlife Fund, 1985 (presented by the Prince Philip)
 Society of Animal Artists Award of Excellence 1979, 1980, 1981, 1986, 1990, 2008; Lifetime Achievement 2010
 Lescarbot Award presented by the Canadian Government, 1992
 Rachel Carson Award presented by the Society of Environmental Toxicology and Chemistry, Washington D.C., 1996
 Order of British Columbia, 2001
 Rungius Medal presented by the National Museum of Wildlife Art, 2001
 Queen's Jubilee Medal, 2002
 Roland Michener Conservation Award presented by the Canadian Wildlife Federation, 2003
 Ideas for Life Award, Canadian Environment Awards, 2006
 Human Rights Defender Award presented by Amnesty International, 2007
 Niagara Escarpment Lifetime Achievement Award, 2009
 Royal Canadian Geographical Society Gold Medal, 2013
 World Ecology Award, University of Missouri-St. Louis, 2015.
International Brandwein Medal, Brandwein Institute, 2017
Jay N. Ding Darling Award, The Wildlife Society, 2017

Books
The Art of Robert Bateman. Biography by Ramsay Derry. Madison Press Books, 1981. (French ed. 1982, German ed. 1984)
The World of Robert Bateman. Biography by Ramsay Derry. Madison Press Books, 1984
Robert Bateman: An Artist in Nature. Biography by Rick Archbold. Madison Press Books, 1990
Robert Bateman: Natural Worlds. Text by Rick Archbold. Madison Press Books, 1996
Safari. Robert Bateman and Rick Archibald. 1998
Thinking Like a Mountain. Robert Bateman and Rick Archbold. Penguin Books, 2000
Birds. Robert Bateman and Kathryn Dean. Madison Press Books, 2002
Backyard Birds. Robert Bateman with Ian Coutts. Madison Press Books, 2005
Birds of Prey. Robert Bateman with Nancy Kovacs. Madison Press Books, 2007
Polar Worlds. Robert Bateman with Nancy Kovacs. Madison Press Books, 2008
Vanishing Habitats. Robert Bateman with Nancy Kovacs. Madison Press Books, 2010
Bateman: New Works. Greystone Books, 2010
Hope & Wild Apples. Bateman Foundation, 2012
Sight Unseen. Paul Gilbert, Bateman Foundation, 2014
Life Sketches: A Memoir. Simon & Schuster, 2015
Robert Bateman's Canada. Simon & Schuster, 2017

Films 

 “Down to Earth”, Zephyr Films, 2001
 "Life and Times of Robert Bateman", Canadian Broadcasting Corporation, 1997
 "Robert Bateman", Art Gallery of Greater Victoria, 1994
 "A Day in the Life of Robert Bateman", Canadian Broadcasting Corporation, 1985
 "Robert Bateman - Artist/Naturalist", Canadian Broadcasting Corporation, Spectrum, 1984  [Donna Lu Wigmore, producer]
 "Robert Bateman - A Celebration of Nature", Canadian Broadcasting Corporation. Take 30, 1983 [Brigitte Berman, producer]
 "The Nature Art of Robert Bateman", Eco-Art Productions, 1981 [Norm Lightfoot, producer]
 "Images of the Wild: A Portrait of Robert Bateman", National Film Board of Canada, 1978 [Norm Lightfoot, director; Beryl Fox, producer]
 "Robert Bateman", Canadian Broadcasting Corporation, This Land, 1972 [John Lucky, producer]

References

External links
 The Bateman Foundation (official website)
 Canadian Broadcasting Corporation: the Life And Times of Robert Bateman (archived URL)
 Robert Bateman's Ideas Bateman's thoughts on various issues
 Interview with the Oxonian Review in January 2011
 Audio interview with Bateman, October 2010
Robert Bateman

1930 births
Living people
20th-century Canadian painters
Canadian male painters
21st-century Canadian painters
Animal artists
Members of the Order of British Columbia
Members of the Royal Canadian Academy of Arts
Officers of the Order of Canada
Artists from Toronto
University of Toronto alumni
Canadian environmentalists
20th-century Canadian male artists
21st-century Canadian male artists
Canadian bird artists